Chap Wai Kon is a village in Sha Tin District, Hong Kong.

Administration
Chap Wai Kon is a recognized village under the New Territories Small House Policy. It is one of the villages represented within the Sha Tin Rural Committee. For electoral purposes, Chap Wai Kon is part of the Yu Yan constituency, which was formerly represented by Lo Yuet-chau until July 2021.

References

Further reading

External links

 Delineation of area of existing village Chap Wai Kon (Sha Tin) for election of resident representative (2019 to 2022)

Villages in Sha Tin District, Hong Kong